Aparallactus werneri, or the Usambara centipede-eater, is a species of venomous rear-fanged snake in the family Lamprophiidae. The species is endemic to Tanzania.

Etymology
The specific name, werneri, is in honor of Austrian herpetologist Franz Werner, from whom Boulenger obtained the type series of specimens.

Geographic range
A. werneri is found in eastern Tanzania in Usambara and the Uluguru Mountains.

Description
Dorsally, A. werneri is blackish with a deep black, light-edged nuchal collar. The upper lip is blackish below the eye, and yellowish in front of and behind the eye. Ventrally it is uniformly yellowish.

The dorsal scales are smooth, without pits, and are arranged in 15 rows. The ventrals number 147-160. The anal plate is entire. The subcaudals number 32–41, and are also entire.

The portion of the rostral visible from above is nearly half as long as its distance from the frontal. The internasals are much shorter than the prefrontals. The frontal is one and a half times as long as broad, longer than its distance from the end of the snout, as long as the parietals. The nasal is entire, in contact with the preocular. There are two postoculars, both in contact with the anterior temporal. The temporals are arranged 1+1. There are six upper labials, the second and third entering the eye. The first lower labial is in contact with its fellow behind the mental. Three lower labials contact the anterior chin shield. There are two pairs of chin shields, the anterior pair broader and slightly longer than the posterior pair.

Reproduction
A. werneri is oviparous.

Taxonomy
A. werneri is sometimes placed in the subfamily Aparallactinae within the family Atractaspididae.

References

Further reading
Boulenger GA (1895). "Descriptions of two new snakes from Usambara, German East Africa". Annals and Magazine of Natural History, Sixth Series 16: 171–173. (Aparallactus werneri, new species, p. 172).
Rasmussen JB (1981). "The snakes from the rainforest of the Usambara Mountains, Tanzania: a checklist and key". Salamandra 17 (3/4): 173–188. (Aparallactus werneri, pp. 179, 182, 183) (in English, with an abstract in German). 
Spawls, Stephen; Howell, Kim; Hinkel, Harald; Menegon, Michele (2018). Field Guide to East African Reptiles, Second Edition. London: Bloomsbury Natural History. 624 pp. . (Aparallactus werneri, p. 457).

Atractaspididae
Reptiles described in 1895